The Mauritanian shrew (Crocidura lusitania) is a species of mammal in the family Soricidae. It is found in Algeria, Burkina Faso, Eritrea, Ethiopia, Gambia, Guinea, Guinea-Bissau, Mali, Mauritania, Morocco, Niger, Nigeria, Senegal, Sierra Leone. Its natural habitats are dry savanna and subtropical or tropical dry shrubland.

References
 Hutterer, R. 2004.  Crocidura lusitania.   2006 IUCN Red List of Threatened Species.   Downloaded on 30 July 2007.

Mauritanian shrew
Mammals of Eritrea
Mammals of Ethiopia
Fauna of Western Sahara
Mammals of North Africa
Mammals of West Africa
Mauritanian shrew
Taxonomy articles created by Polbot